Sweet Fever is the Norwegian singer, Tone Damli's second studio album, which was released on 8 May 2007. It was produced by David Eriksen and Martin Sjølie. The album peaked at number 8 on the Norwegian Albums Chart.

Track listing 
"Lovesong" – 4:00 
"Young & Foolish" – 4:02 
"How Could You" – 3:27 
"The Greatest Gift" – 3:50 
"Fever" – 3:58 
"Ghosts" – 4:16 
"Hate You" – 3:47 
"Felicia" – 4:14 
"Not A Day Goes By" – 4:10 
"Rome" – 3:22

Charts

Release history

References

2007 albums
Tone Damli albums